Barrhill may refer to:
 Barrhill, South Ayrshire, a village in South Ayrshire, Scotland
 Barrhill railway station, a railway station in South Ayrshire on the Glasgow South Western Line
 Barrhill, New Zealand, a lightly populated locality in the Canterbury region of New Zealand's South Island

See also
 Bar Hill
 Bar Hill Fort, the Roman fort on the Antonine Wall